Mohammad Shaheen has been a professor of English literature at the University of Jordan in Amman, Jordan since 1985. Shaheen holds a PhD degree in English literature from Cambridge University. He is the author of many books, including E.M. Forster and the Politics of Imperialism.

Shaheen teaches modern literary theory and criticism in the Faculty of Modern Languages at the University of Jordan, he also teaches the English novel, twentieth-century English literature, Literary translation and comparative literature.

He has been the editor-in-chief of Al-Majallah Al-Thaqafeyyah (University of Jordan) since 2008. He has also translated the poetry of Mahmoud Darwish into English.

Experience
 Professor of English, the University of Jordan, 1985 till now
 Assistant of the president of the University of Jordan and head of the president's Office 1978-1980
 Advisor to the Ministry of Higher Education - Jordan, 1985-1989
 Chairman of the English Department, the University of Jordan, 1988-1990
 Chairman of the Modern Languages Department, the University of Jordan, 1988-1990
 Visiting professor at Taiz University, Yemen, 1993
 Chairman of the English Department, the University of Jordan, 1993-1995
 Visiting professor at Qatar University, Qatar, 1996
 Vice president of Mutah University, Jordan, 1998-2002
 Associate editor of Paideuma, University of Maine, 1967-till now
 Editor-in-chief of Mu'tah for Research, 1998-2002
 Literary editor of Dirasat, the University of Jordan research journal, 1985-1991
 Editor-in-chief of Al-Majallah Al-Thaqafiyyah, University of Jordan, 2008-till now

Memberships, fellowships and scholarships
 Member of the Higher Curricula Committee, the Ministry of Higher Education, Jordan, 1991-1993
 Member of the Executive Committee of the International Comparative Literature Association, 1985-till now
 British Council Scholarship, 1969-1973
 Fulbright Scholarship, (Summer of 1979)
 Beirut University, DAAD scholarship, 1982
 University of Oxford, associate fellow of St Antony's College, Oxford, 1983 till now
 American research fellowships in Humanities (1987)
 University of Bonn (1995)
 DAAD-Bochum University (1998)

Books published
  The Modern Arabic Short Story: Shahrazad Returns. Palgrave Macmillan, 2 edition (22 February 2003), 304 pages
  George Meredith: A reappraisal of the Novels. Macmillan Press: London 1981
  Selected Letters of George Meredith. Macmillan Press: London
  E.M. Forster and the Politics of Imperialism, Palgrave Macmillan (12 August 2004), 256 pages
  Almond Blossoms and Beyond (translation). Interlink Publishing 2009

Articles publish
  George Meredith's Early Life: Ordeal and Reticence: The Modern Language Review April 1982 Vol. 77
  The Reception of Pound in Arabic: Immature response of Gibran and Bayyati: Paideuma, Vol 34
  The Arabian Nights in English Literature (book review): The Yearbook of English Studies, Vol 22
  Pickthall: New Dictionary of National Biography. Oxford, Clarenden Press, 2004
  On Meredith's Letters: American Notes and Queries, Yale 1974
  Forster on Proust: Times Literary Supplement, London 1974
  Tayeb Salih and Conrad: Comparative Literature Studies, University of Illinois, 1985
  T.L. Lawrence and Pound: Paideuma, 1988
  The Manuscript of Meredith's Last Novel: Notes and Queries, Oxford 1975
  Meredith Letter to Stephen: Notes and Queries, Oxford 1978
  Some Unpublished Hardy Letters to Gosse: Notes and Queries, Oxford 1980
  Two New Meredith Letters to Gosse: Notes and Queries, Oxford, 1980

Resources 

  Interlink Website
  Ministry of Culture in Jordan

References

Year of birth missing (living people)
Living people
University of Colorado alumni
Ain Shams University alumni
Alumni of the University of Cambridge
Fellows of St Antony's College, Oxford
Academic staff of Mutah University
Academic staff of Qatar University
University of Maine faculty
Academic staff of the University of Jordan
Jordanian writers